Asia Major may refer to:

Asia Major, a former name for the land east of Anatolia (Asia Minor)
Asia Major (journal), an academic journal on Chinese history

See also
Asia Minor (disambiguation)